Fábio Júnior Nascimento Santana (born November 2, 1983 in Senhor do Bonfim-BA), or simply Fábio Bahia, is a Brazilian defensive midfielder. He is currently playing for São Bento.

Honours
Goiás State League: 2005, 2006

Contract
Goiás: 1 January 2007 to 31 December 2011

External links

globoesporte 
goiasesporteclube.com 
CBF  
Guardian Stats Centre

1983 births
Living people
Brazilian footballers
Brazilian expatriate footballers
Brazilian expatriate sportspeople in South Korea
Expatriate footballers in South Korea
K League 1 players
Campeonato Brasileiro Série B players
Vila Nova Futebol Clube players
Goiás Esporte Clube players
Incheon United FC players
Guarani FC players
Sport Club do Recife players
Association football midfielders